Balterley Green is a village in Staffordshire, England. The population at the 2011 population can be found under Balterley

Villages in Staffordshire